The Innkeeper (Italian: La locandiera also known as Mirandolina) is a 1944 Italian historical comedy film directed by Luigi Chiarini and starring Luisa Ferida, Armando Falconi and Osvaldo Valenti. The film is an adaptation of Carlo Goldoni's 1753 play The Mistress of the Inn, one of a number of times the work has been turned into films. It belongs to the movies of the calligrafismo style.

Production
The film was originally shot in Rome. During the last stages of completion, Mussolini was overthrown. The final editing was done in Venice, the film capital of the Italian Social Republic, but without the presence of Chiarini. Two of its stars Luisa Ferida and Osvaldo Valenti were later executed by Italian Partisans for collaboration with the Fascist leadership.

Cast
 Luisa Ferida as Mirandolina  
 Armando Falconi as Il marchese di Forlimpopoli  
 Osvaldo Valenti as Il cavaliere di Ripafratta 
 Camillo Pilotto as Il conte di Albafiorita  
 Elsa De Giorgi as Ortensia, l'attrice 
 Paola Borboni as Dejanira, l'attrice  
 Olga Solbelli as La contessa di Albafiorita  
 Mario Pisu as Fabrizio 
 Carlo Micheluzzi as Orazio, il capocomico  
 Emilio Baldanello as Brighella  
 Ernesto Zanon as Arlecchino  
 Mario Siletti as Pandolfo, il servo di Ripafratta 
 Pina Piovani as Lucrezia, la cameriera della locanda  
 Andrea Volo as Florindo  
 Clara Vaschetti as La domestica delle attrici 
 Gino Cervi as  Il poeta 
 Igilda Bertina   
 Giulia Toscani
 Liliana Ruffo
 Saro Urzì

References

Bibliography 
 Brunetta, Gian Piero. The History of Italian Cinema: A Guide to Italian Film from Its Origins to the Twenty-first Century.  Princeton University Press, 2009. 
 Moliterno, Gino. The A to Z of Italian Cinema. Scarecrow Press, 2009. 
 Reich, Jacqueline & Garofalo, Piero. Re-viewing Fascism: Italian Cinema, 1922-1943. Indiana University Press, 2002.

External links 
 

1944 films
1940s Italian-language films
Films directed by Luigi Chiarini
Italian films based on plays
Films set in the 18th century
Adaptations of works by Carlo Goldoni
Italian black-and-white films
Italian historical comedy films
1940s historical comedy films
1944 comedy films
1940s Italian films